Krupuk (Javanese), kurupuk (Sundanese), kerupuk  (Indonesian), keropok (Malay), kroepoek (Dutch) or kropek (Tagalog) is a cracker made from starch or animal skin and other ingredients that serve as flavouring. Most krupuk are deep fried, while some others are grilled or hot sand fried. They are a popular snack in maritime Southeast Asia (Indonesia, Singapore, Malaysia, Brunei, and Philippines), and is most closely associated with the culinary traditions of Indonesia, in particular Javanese cuisine. It is an ubiquitous staple in its country of origin, and has spread to other countries either via the migration of diaspora populations or exports.

Etymology 
Krupuk in Javanese means "fried side dish" (made of flour, mixed with other ingredients). The word was later absorbed to other languages and stylesized according to local pronunciations. In Indonesia and the modern states of Brunei, Malaysia, Singapore, and the Philippines, it appears under a general name with minor phonetic variations. In Indonesian, it is "kerupuk" while in Malay, it is "keropok". In Dutch, it is "kroepoek" ("oe" being equivalent to "u"), which was also the original spelling prior to the establishment of modern Indonesia and post-independence spelling reform.

The Javanese onomatopoeia for the sound of crunchy foods (krauk for a big crunch; kriuk for a small crunch) is believed to have inspired the name. It might have also inspired the naming of kripik, a different type of Javanese cracker.

History 
According to culinary historian Fadly Rahman, krupuk had existed in Java since the 9th or 10th century. It was written in the Batu Pura Inscription as krupuk rambak, which refers to crackers made from cow or buffalo skin, that still exist today as krupuk kulit ("skin krupuk"),  and are usually used in a Javanese dish called krechek. In its development, krupuk spreads across the archipelago, and the taste varies according to the ingredients. From Java, krupuk spread to various coastal areas of Kalimantan, Sumatra, to the Malay Peninsula. It is produced and consumed in various varieties and is an integral part of the national cuisines of several Southeast Asian countries. Kroepoek also can be found in the Netherlands, through their historic colonial ties with Indonesia.

Today, krupuk has been one of food-product export commodities of Indonesia, reaching foreign markets including Thailand, China, South Korea, the United States, Mexico, and the European Union.

Preparation and consumption 
To achieve maximum crunchiness, most of this pre-packed raw krupuk must be sun-dried first before being deep fried at home. To cook krupuk, a wok with plenty of high-temperature cooking oil is needed. A healthier, fatless version might be made by briefly pulsing the raw krupuk in the microwave oven: usually one minute at the medium (~700W) power is enough to successfully puff a handful of chips. Raw krupuk is quite small, hard, and darker in color than the cooked one.

Krupuk and kripik can be consumed alone as a snack, or cracked and garnished on top of foods for a complementary, crisp texture. Certain Indonesian dishes such as gado-gado, karedok, rujak, asinan, bubur ayam and certain kinds of soto require a certain type of krupuk for toppings. It is an essential ingredient to make seblak, a savoury-spicy dish made of boiled, wet krupuk cooked with a protein (chicken, beef, or seafood), all in a spicy sauce.

Types

Indonesia 

Indonesia has perhaps the largest variety of krupuk. There are many variations on krupuk, many of which are made from starch with seafood (shrimp, fish, or squid), but occasionally with rice, fruits, nuts or vegetables; these variations are more usual in Southeast Asia.

 Krupuk amplang, refer to pingpong ball-sized fish krupuk from Kalimantan.
 Krupuk bawang, garlic cracker
 Krupuk gendar, ground rice cracker
 Krupuk ikan, fish cracker, commonly found in Indonesia, especially seafood industry production centres such as Palembang, Bangka, Cirebon and Sidoarjo. Wahoo is the most popular fish used to make krupuk ikan, however a more expensive variant uses belida fish or featherback knifefish.
 Krupuk blek (also krupuk uyel, krupuk kampung, or krupuk putih), a cassava starch cracker ubiquitous in Indonesia
 Krupuk kemplang, a type of flat fish cracker is particularly popular in south Sumatran city of Palembang
 Krupuk kuku macan, another name of amplang with distinct "tiger nail", nugget-shaped, brown-coloured fish cracker, popularly associated with Samarinda and the island of Bangka.
 Krupuk kulit, found in most parts of Indonesia, Krupuk jangek (Minangkabau), or Rambak (Java); refer to crackers made of dried cattle skin, particularly popular in the Minangkabau area of West Sumatra.
 Krupuk kulit babi, crispy fried pork skin, also known as pork rinds. Rarely found in Muslim-majority regions in Indonesia, but common in non-Muslim majority provinces, such as Bali, North Sumatra, and North Sulawesi.
 Krupuk mie (noodle cracker), is yellowish krupuk made from noodle-like paste usually used for asinan topping, particularly popular in Jakarta and most markets in Java.
 Krupuk udang, shrimp cracker or prawn cracker probably is the most internationally well-known variant of krupuk. The examples of popular krupuk udang brands in Indonesia is Resep Kerupuk Udang, Finna and Komodo brand whereas the popular krupuk udang household brands in Malaysia are Rota Prawn Crackers and myReal Pulau Pangkor Prawn Crackers.

Malaysia 

In Malaysia, it is called keropok and associated with fish and seafood (those made with other foods than fish and seafood are called kerepek). Varieties of keropok found in Malaysia Keropok kering, Keropok lekor and amplang. Keropok lekor originated from Terengganu, and Amplang is endemic to the coastal towns of Semporna and Tawau in Sabah. While keropok kering can be found in most of Malaysia states, Mukah town in Sarawak also historically known as a fishing town for the making of keropok.

Philippines 
Krupuk, most commonly spelt as kropek and kropeck in the Philippines, is sometimes also referred to as "fish crackers", "prawn crackers" or less commonly as "fish chicharrón", which is technically fried fish skin. Some forms of chicharrón are made with non-animal sources such as tapioca starch and green peas, hence the term. It is debatable if the vegetarian, kropek-like "mock pork crackling" could be considered a form of kropek, since there are a lot of similarities but also differences which make them two. These are sold at sari-sari stores in smaller portions as a light snack, as well as in bigger bags at local supermarkets and convenience stores.

Kropek is often eaten as an appetizer, with a vinegar and chili dipping sauce, sometimes as accompaniment at drinking sessions, or paired with a meal. There are a lot of local brands which sell different varieties of kropek. Some of the more well-known brands in the Philippines are La La Fish Crackers and Oishi prawn crackers, fish crackers, and fish kropeck. Oishi, a Philippines-based company that has expanded across Asia, is one of the biggest Filipino and Asian companies.

Production centres 

In Indonesia, major producing centres of krupuk usually are coastal fishing towns. Sidoarjo in East Java, Cirebon in West Java, Karimun Jawa island, Padang, Palembang and Medan in Sumatra, Bangka Island, Samarinda and Pontianak in Kalimantan, and Makassar in Sulawesi are major producers of krupuk, and many recipes originate from there.

Some inland towns also famous as krupuk production centres, such as Bandung, Garut and Malang. Although usually they are not producing seafood-based krupuk as their coastal towns counterparts. Most of krupuk producer traditionally are modest home industry. However, today there is a dilemma among krupuk factories, whether to shift to automation through modern machinery but have to lay-off some of their workers, or continues producing in traditional ways but lack in producing capacity.

Most of the coastal towns in Malaysia such as Mukah, Malacca Town, Pangkor Island and Lumut produce keropok from large scale manufacturing to small scale home factories.

See also 

 Prawn cracker
 Fish cracker
 Kabkab
 Kiping
 Kripik
 Rempeyek
 Emping
 Seblak
 Duros

References

External links 

Indonesian snack foods
Malaysian cuisine
Southeast Asian cuisine
Deep fried foods